The (Parliamentary) Committee on Finance (FiU) is a parliamentary committee in the Swedish Riksdag. The committee's main areas of responsibility concern economics. They are also responsible for examining how central government revenue is added up and compiling the yearly central government budget.

The committee's Speaker is Edward Riedl from the Moderate Party and the vice-Speaker is Mikael Damberg from the Social Democratic Party.

List of speakers for the committee

List of vice-speakers for the committee

References

External links
Riksdag – Finansutskottet (Finance Committee)

Committees of the Riksdag